Malini or Kusuma Kumari was an Indian actress who starred in Tamil language and Telugu language films between 1955 and 1962. Although she only appeared in a few films, she co-starred with well-known actors of her era, including N. T. Rama Rao, Sivaji Ganesan, M. G. Ramachandran, S. S. Rajendran, K. Balaji and Chalam.

Malini was credited by various names over her career. In her earlier Telugu films, she was credited as Kusuma or Kusuma Kumari. She later adopted Malini as screen name for her Tamil film Sabaash Meena and later films. She later married S.Raghavan (producer-director of film Sabaash Mapillai) and quit films.

Filmography

References

Actresses in Tamil cinema
Indian Tamil people
20th-century Indian actresses
Tamil actresses
Indian film actresses